The Northern Finland Regional State Administrative Agency is one of the six Regional State Administrative Agencies. The responsibility area of the agency consists of two regions, nine sub-regions and 43 municipalities.

Regions

References 

Oulu Province